The Ninth Heart is a 1979 Czechoslovak dark fantasy fairy tale horror film directed by Juraj Herz. The film starred Josef Kemr.

Cast
Ondřej Pavelka as Student Martin
Anna Maľová as Puppeteer Tončka
Julie Jurištová as Princess Adriena
Josef Kemr as Principal, Tončka's father
Juraj Kukura as Count Aldobrandini, astrologist
František Filipovský as Jester

References

External links
 

1979 films
Czechoslovak fantasy films
1970s Czech-language films
Films directed by Juraj Herz
Films scored by Petr Hapka
Czech fantasy films
Films based on fairy tales
1970s Czech films
Czech dark fantasy films